Sigma Ophiuchi, Latinized from σ Ophiuchi, is a single, orange-hued star in the equatorial constellation Ophiuchus. Its apparent visual magnitude is 4.31, which is bright enough to be faintly visible to the naked eye. The annual parallax shift of 3.62 mas as seen from Earth provides a distance estimate of roughly 900 light years. It is moving closer to the Sun with a radial velocity of −28 km/s.

This is an evolved giant star of type K with a stellar classification of K2 III. Wittkowski et al. (2017) consider it to have a luminosity class of II-III, suggesting it is in a transitional zone between giants and supergiant stars. It has around 5 times the mass of the Sun and 73 times the Sun's radius. The star is radiating 2,047 times the Sun's luminosity from its enlarged photosphere at an effective temperature of 4,540 K.

References

K-type giants
Suspected variables
Ophiuchi, Sigma
Ophiuchus (constellation)
J17263087+0408252
BD+04 3422
Ophiuchi, 49
157999
085355
6498